Corymbia scabrida, commonly known as the rough-leaved yellowjacket, is a species of small tree that is endemic to central Queensland. It has rough, tessellated bark on the trunk and branches, a crown of juvenile and intermediate leaves, flower buds in groups of seven, white flowers and barrel-shaped to urn-shaped or shortened spherical fruit.

Description
It has tessellated, pale brown to yellow-brown or orange bark on the trunk and branches. Flowering has been observed in October and the flowers are white.

Taxonomy and naming
This yellow bloodwood was first formally described in 1991 by Ian Brooker and Anthony Bean who gave it the name Eucalyptus scabrida and published the description in the journal Austrobaileya. In 1995 Ken Hill and Lawrie Johnson changed the name to Corymbia scabrida. The specific epithet (scabrida) is from the Latin word scabridus meaning "somewhat scabrous".

Distribution and habitat
Corymbia scabrida grows on low sandstone ridges and hills in shallow, sandy, loamy or gravelly soils. It is found in woodland communities and is often co-dominant in association with Eucalyptus melanophloia, E. chloroclada, Corymbia clarksoniana, C. polycarpa and Angophora leiocarpa. It occurs from west of Springsure to near Tambo.

Conservation status
Rough-leaved yellowjacket is classified as "near threatened" under the Queensland Government Nature Conservation Act 1992.

See also
List of Corymbia species

References

scabrida
Myrtales of Australia
Flora of Queensland
Plants described in 1991
Taxa named by Ian Brooker
Taxa named by Anthony Bean